Ralph "Ray" Hornblower III (born March 17, 1948) is chairman of Hornblower & Company, LLC, an investment firm specializing in early stage companies in the biomedical, alternative energy, health care, and transportation/logistics sectors.

Early life
Hornblower was born on March 17, 1948.  He was the son of Ralph Hornblower Jr. and Priscilla (née Blumer) Hornblower.  He is the great-grandson of Henry Hornblower, the founder of Hornblower & Weeks. His grandfather and father were in their turn partners in that firm.  Although the present firm of Hornblower & Company is not a descendant firm, the right to the name Hornblower passed, by the original Hornblower & Weeks partnership agreement, to Ralph Hornblower, thence to Ralph, Jr., and to Ralph III.

Hornblower graduated in 1970 from Harvard where he was elected to the  Owl Club.  Hornblower was a left halfback for the Crimson football team, and earned designation as an All-Ivy League second team member in 1968. Hornblower played in the Harvard wins 29-29 contest versus Yale.  Hornblower obtained a law degree in 1974 from the University of Virginia Law School.

Career
Following his graduation from law school, Hornblower joined the U.S. Department of Justice in 1974, first working as a trial attorney in the Special Litigation Section of the Department's Civil Rights Division.  Subsequently, in the post-Watergate period under Attorneys General Edward Levi and Griffin Bell, he was assigned to oversee all matters of ethics and professional responsibility in the Justice Department.

Opera singer
Leaving the Justice Department in 1980, and after spending one year in private practice, Hornblower began a second career as a professional concert and opera singer by spending six years in Paris and while overseas was house tenor for the Bulgarian National Opera.  As a tenor, he performed principal roles in Turandot and Carmen at Opera Pacific in Costa Mesa, California and at opera festivals in Aix-en-Provence, France, and Buxton, England.

Hornblower was a member of the board of overseers of Plimoth Plantation, the living history museum in Plymouth, Mass., that was founded by his uncle, Henry Hornblower II.

Personal life
Between 1969 and 2000, Hornblower was married to Margot Roosevelt (b. 1950), great-granddaughter of U.S. president Theodore Roosevelt. They divorced in 2000,  and had two sons. In 2004, he married Cynthia Morgan Edmunds, executive editor of Bride's magazine. They have one daughter.

References

1948 births
Living people
Harvard University alumni
University of Virginia School of Law alumni